Gilbert Martin Paterson (born in Springburn, Glasgow, 1942) is a Scottish National Party (SNP) politician, who served as the Member of the Scottish Parliament (MSP) for Clydebank and Milngavie, from 2011 to 2021. Previously he had been an MSP for the West of Scotland region, having been elected on 3 May 2007. From 1999 to 2003 he was an MSP for Central Scotland.

Career
Brought up in Springburn in the North of Glasgow, Paterson attended Possilpark Secondary School, before building up his own business Gil's Motor Factors. He served as a Scottish National Party (SNP) councillor in Strathclyde Regional Council and sat on the SNP's National Executive Committee, before being elected as one of five SNP MSPs for Central Scotland in the first election to the Scottish Parliament. During the first parliamentary term he sat on both the Local Government and Procedures committees in the Parliament.

At the 2003 election, only three SNP MSPs were returned for Central Scotland and Paterson lost his seat in Parliament. He returned to running his business but stayed active in the SNP, becoming the party's vice-convenor in charge of fundraising, a position he had held previously.

Paterson was one of the heaviest critics of the leadership style of John Swinney, and in the aftermath of the 2004 European election he openly called for Swinney's resignation, which happened shortly afterwards.

In 2006, Paterson was selected to stand as candidate for the Clydebank and Milngavie Scottish Parliamentary constituency.

In the 2016-2021 session of the Scottish Parliament, Paterson was elected as the SNP Group convener. He is also a member of two committees, 'European and External Relations' and 'Subordinate Legislation', the latter of which he is deputy-convener.

In August 2020, Paterson announced that he would be stepping down as an MSP at the 2021 Scottish Parliament election. Writing in the Clydebank Post, he said, "I shall not be seeking re-election in May due to personal circumstances. This was a decision I took very reluctantly, after a long period of reflection."

Ideological positions

Brexit 
Paterson voted Remain in the June 2016 referendum on the United Kingdom's EU membership. He was active in raising Brexit concerns for business and economics in Scotland, including questioning First Minister Nicola Sturgeon at First Minister's Questions in the Scottish Parliament.

Free tuition 
Mr Paterson is a supporter of free tuition fees in Scotland, and appeared in the Milngavie and Bearsden Herald in August 2017 asking for clarity from East Dunbartonshire MP Jo Swinson, a Liberal Democrat, about her stance following comments made by her party leader, Vince Cable, in The Press and Journal.

References

External links 
 

1942 births
Living people
Members of the Scottish Parliament 1999–2003
Scottish National Party MSPs
Members of the Scottish Parliament 2007–2011
Members of the Scottish Parliament 2011–2016
Politicians from Glasgow
Members of the Scottish Parliament 2016–2021
People from Possilpark